The Universal Kinship is a 1906 book by American zoologist, philosopher, educator and socialist J. Howard Moore. In the book, Moore advocated for a secular sentiocentric philosophy, called the Universal Kinship, which mandated the ethical consideration and treatment of all sentient beings based on Darwinian principles of shared evolutionary kinship, and a universal application of the Golden Rule; a direct challenge to anthropocentric hierarchies and ethics. The book was endorsed by Henry S. Salt, Mark Twain and Jack London, Eugene V. Debs and Mona Caird. Moore expanded on his ideas in The New Ethics, published in 1907.

Summary 
The book is split into three parts—the physical, psychical and ethical—each exploring and evidencing the sources of kinship between humans and nonhuman animals. To support his claims, Moore drew "extensively upon the fields of geology, paleontology, and biology, together with the works of evolutionary scientists such as Darwin, Huxley, Haeckel, Romanes, and John Lubbock."

Arguments 

In the book, Moore argued that arrogance prevents humans from recognizing their kinship with nonhuman animals and grievously mistreating them, likening their "provincialist" attitude to chauvinism and racism:

The denial by human animals of ethical relations to the rest of the animal world is a phenomenon not differing either in character or cause from the denial of ethical relations by a tribe, people, or race of human beings to the rest of the human world.

Moore criticized the anthropocentrism of human beings, who "think of our acts toward non-human peoples [...] entirely from the human point of view. We never take the time to put ourselves in the places of our victims." These arguments were antecedents of the concept of speciesism, which was coined as a term 63 years later by Richard D. Ryder.

Moore also asserted that exploitation—the consideration of other beings as means not ends—as the only and greatest crime in the universe and that it had been carried out throughout the history of life, with all other crimes stemming from it. He argued that humans routinely inflict this crime on animals—their fellow sentient beings—and instead advocated for a non-anthropocentric version of the Golden Rule as the only consistent ethical model "since Darwin established the unity of life" for our behaviour towards others:

Yes, do as you would be done by—and not to the dark man and the white woman alone, but to the sorrel horse and the gray squirrel as well; not to creatures of your own anatomy only, but to all creatures.

Moore claimed that his philosophy of "Universal Kinship" was not new, and had been advocated for by many writers both historical and contemporary, including Gautama Buddha, Pythagoras, Plutarch, Percy Shelley and Leo Tolstoy.

Moore also argued that animals have "the same general rights to life and happiness, as we ourselves" and that we should similarly aim to maximise their happiness and minimize their suffering in a utilitarian manner.

Reception 

The Universal Kinship was well-received by several contemporary figures. The English writer Henry S. Salt, Moore's friend and fellow animal rights advocate, later described the book in his autobiography as "the best ever written in the humanitarian cause". Upon the book's publication in the United Kingdom, Salt widely publicized it using his Humanitarian League network. The book received positive reviews in The Daily Telegraph, the Evening Standard, The Clarion, The Standard and Reynold's News. 

American socialist Eugene V. Debs declared that "[i]t is impossible for me to express my appreciation of your masterly work. It is simply great, and every socialist and student of sociology should read it." Debs was inspired by the book to publish an article "Man and Mule", reflecting on the relationship between mules and humans. 

Moore sent a personal copy of the book to the American writer Mark Twain, who replied:The book has furnished me several days of deep pleasure and satisfaction; it has compelled my gratitude at the same time, since it saves me the labor of stating my own long-cherished opinions and reflections and resentments by doing it lucidly and fervently and irascibly for me.In an endorsement, the American writer Jack London stated:Mr. Moore has a broad grasp and shows masterly knowledge of the subject. And withal the interest never flags. The book reads like a novel. One is constantly keyed up and expectant. Mr. Moore is to be congratulated upon the magnificent way in which he has made alive the dull, heavy processes of the big books. And, then, there is his style. He uses splendid virile English and shows a fine appreciation of the values of words. He uses always the right word.In his copy, London marked the passage "All beings are ends; no creatures are means. All beings have not equal rights, neither have all men; but all have rights."

English feminist and writer Mona Caird, was so deeply moved by the book that she wrote Moore a personal letter, declaring:
It leaves me in a glow of enthusiasm and hope. It seems like the embodiment of years of almost despairing effort and pain of all of us who have felt these things. That which we have been thinking and feeling—some in one direction and some in another, some in fuller understanding and breadth, others in little flashes of insight here and there—all seems gathered together, expressed, and given form and color and life in your wonderful book.

American socialist Julius Wayland endorsed the book, describing the book as "not exactly socialism", but that it would open up a new world for its readers and that the book was a "scientific education within itself."

Criticism 
The National Anti-Vivisection Society's review approved of Moore’s illustration of "the ethical kinship" between humans and animals but objected to the idea that evolution could explain the evolution of human mental capacity. The RSPCA's review felt that while Moore's arguments were well supported, they took exception with his Darwinian perspective, stating that "there is much in it that cannot be agreed with".

G. M. A.'s review in The American Naturalist, stated that: "[w]hile agreeing with the author that 'the art of being kind' is in sore need of cultivation among us, one cannot but be amused at the mixture of fact and error, observation and travelers' tales, seriousness of statement and straining after absurd expressions, that characterizes this not unreadable book." J. R. Stanton in American Anthropologist was also critical, stating "[i]ts failing, as in the case of so many works of similar nature, is that in sweeping away impassable gulfs it ignores real differences."

Editions 
The book's publisher, Charles H. Kerr & Co., included the book in its International Library of Social Science series; the series was described as "positively indispensable to the student of socialism." In 1906, the same year as the book's original publication, The Whole World Kin, a condensed version of the book was published in London by George Bell & Sons; They also published an unabridged version of the book. The Humanitarian League also published the book.

In the same year, Felix Ortt produced a Dutch translation of the book. In 1908, Ōsugi Sakae and Sakai Toshihiko translated the book into Japanese.

The book was reissued by Centaur Press in 1992, edited by animal rights philosopher Charles R. Magel, with added appendices, including "letters from Moore to Salt, a biographical essay and the eulogy Clarence Darrow delivered at Moore's funeral."

See also 
 Moral circle expansion
 Evolutional Ethics and Animal Psychology
 The Expanding Circle

References

External links 

1906 non-fiction books
Animal ethics books
Books about animal rights
Books about evolution
Books about wild animal suffering
Books by J. Howard Moore
Charles H. Kerr Publishing Company books
English-language books
Vegetarian-related mass media
Works about utilitarianism